The Bergamasque Alps or Bergamo Alps (Italian: Alpi Orobie, sometimes translated into English as Orobic Alps) are a mountain range in the Italian Alps. They are located in northern Lombardy and named after the city Bergamo, south of the mountains. Within the Eastern Alps, the Alpine Club or AVE system places them within the Western Limestone Alps, while the SOIUSA system classifies them within the Southeastern Alps.

Peaks
The main peaks of the Bergamasque Alps are:

Passes
The main mountain passes of the Bergamasque Alps are:

Gallery

Panorama

Maps
 Italian official cartography (Istituto Geografico Militare - IGM); on-line version: www.pcn.minambiente.it

See also 
 Bergamasque Prealps

References 

Mountain ranges of the Alps
Central Alps
Mountain ranges of Italy
Mountains of Lombardy